Tualatin Public Library is the library within Washington County Cooperative Library Services serving Tualatin, Oregon. In 2012, The Oregonian reported that nearly 200 volunteers contribute more than 1,000 hours to the library each month.

References

External links

 Friends of the Tualatin Public Library
 Tualatin Library Foundation

Tualatin, Oregon
Washington County Cooperative Library Services